Route 119 is a  northwest-southeast state highway in Massachusetts. Its western terminus is a continuation of New Hampshire Route 119 at the New Hampshire border and its eastern terminus is at Route 2 and Route 111 in Concord. It acts as a continuation of New Hampshire Route 119, which is in turn a continuation of Vermont Route 119.

Route description
Route 119 begins in Ashburnham at the New Hampshire state line.  The route passes through Ashburnham State Forest, south of Mount Watatic, and meets Route 101 at its northern end, just west of where Route 119 enters into Ashby.  In Ashby, Route 119 passes through the center of town, crossing Route 31 before passing through Willard Brook State Forest into the town of Townsend.  In Townsend, Route 119 follows along the Squanacook River, crossing it in the town center as well as Route 13.

The route continues eastward, crossing the far western corner of Groton before entering Pepperell.  In Pepperell, Route 119 meets the western end of Route 113 as it heads eastward.  The route joins Route 111 before the two cross the Nashua River back into Groton.  Once in Groton, Route 111 leaves Route 119 as Route 225 joins it.  The two routes continue southeastward, passing the western end of Route 40 before the two routes split south of Lost Lake.  Route 119 continues southeastward into Littleton.  

In Littleton, Route 119 meets I-495 at Exit 80 (formerly 31) before meeting Routes 2A and 110.  Route 2A becomes concurrent with Route 119 as it crosses Route 110.  The two routes continue southeastward, passing Nagog Pond as they enter Acton.  The two routes cross Route 27 south of Nagog Woods.  The routes head southward from the junction, passing through East Acton before turning more eastward as they enter Concord.  After just a half mile, Route 119 ends at a rotary intersection with Route 2, just north of MCI - Concord and where Route 2A begins a silent concurrency with its parent route.

Major intersections

References

"Massachusetts Atlas and Gazetteer."  Yarmouth, Maine: DeLorme.  First Edition, 1998.

External links

119
1922 establishments in Massachusetts